Amba or AMBA may refer to:

Title
 Amba Hor, alternative name for Abhor and Mehraela, Christian martyrs
 Amba Sada, also known as Psote, Christian bishop and martyr in Upper Egypt

Given name
 Amba, the traditional first name given to the first daughter of the royal family in the Kingdom of Cochin, India
 Amba (Mahabharata), the eldest daughter of King of Kashi in the Hindu epic
 Amba Bongo, a writer and advocate for refugees from the Democratic Republic of the Congo
 Amba Etta-Tawo (born 1993), American football player
 Amba Prasad (businessman) (1860–1950), Indian businessman and philanthropist
 Sufi Amba Prasad (1858–1919), Indian nationalist and pan-Islamist leader
 Amba, one of the names of the Hindu goddess Durga
 Amba Shepherd, Australian singer and songwriter

Languages
 Amba language (Solomon Islands), one of the three Utupua languages
 Amba language (Bantu), spoken by the Amba people of Uganda and the Democratic Republic of the Congo

Places
 Amba (river), in Primorsky Krai, Russia
 Amba River (India), in Maharashtra, India
 Amba, Birbhum, a village in Birbhum district, West Bengal India
 Ambaji, a town in Gujarat, India
 Ambadagatti, a village in Karnataka, India

AMBA
 Advanced Microcontroller Bus Architecture, an on-chip bus standard for System-on-Chip (SoC) designs
 Andelsselskab med begrænset ansvar, a type of business entity in Denmark
 Área Metropolitana de Buenos Aires, another name for Greater Buenos Aires
 Association of MBAs

Other uses
 Amba (condiment), a tangy mango pickle condiment with sauce-like consistency
 Amba (film), 1990 Indian Bollywood film
 AMBA (animated film), 1994-1995 Russian animated film
 Amba (geology), a type of steep sided, flat topped mountain in Ethiopia
 Amba people of Uganda and the Democratic Republic of the Congo
 INS Amba (A54), a submarine tender ship formerly in service with the Indian Navy
 Amba, name given to the Siberian tiger by indigenous people in the Russian Far East
 Amba hotels, a brand owned by GLH Hotels
 Operation Amba, a Russian programme to curtail the poaching of Siberian tigers in the Russian Far East

See also
 Ambar (disambiguation)